The 1902–03 Harvard Crimson men's ice hockey season was the sixth season of play for the program.

Season
After losing all three contests against Yale the year before, Harvard made no mistake in defeating the Elis thrice in 1903. The victories capped off Harvard's second undefeated season but this time, as a member of the Intercollegiate Hockey Association, the Crimson captured their first championship as well.

Roster

Standings

Schedule and Results

|-
!colspan=12 style=";" | Regular Season

References

Harvard Crimson men's ice hockey seasons
Harvard
Harvard
Harvard
Harvard
Harvard